Inga incensatella is a moth in the family Oecophoridae. It was described by Francis Walker in 1864. It is found in Venezuela and Guyana.

References

Moths described in 1864
Inga (moth)